Goodbye, Good bye, or Good-bye is a parting phrase and may refer to:

Film
 Goodbye (1918 film), a British drama directed by Maurice Elvey
 Goodbye (1995 film) (Tot Ziens!), a Dutch film directed by Heddy Honigmann
 Goodbye (2004 film), a German short film nominated for a Prix UIP
 Goodbye (2008 film), a Japanese digital film screened at the 2008 Cairo International Film Festival
 Goodbye (2011 film), an Iranian film by Mohammad Rasoulof
 Goodbye (2022 film), an Indian Hindi-language film by Vikas Bahl

Music
 Goodbye: The Greatest Hits Tour, a 2013 tour by JLS

Albums
 Good Bye (Cali Gari album) or the title song, 2003
 Goodbye (Ben & Jason album), 2003
 Goodbye (Bobo Stenson album), 2005
 Goodbye (Cream album), 1969
 Goodbye (The Czars album) or the title song, 2004
 Goodbye (Dubstar album), 1997
 Goodbye (Gene Ammons album), 1974
 Goodbye (Milt Jackson album), 1973
 Goodbye (Ulrich Schnauss album) or the title song, 2007
 Goodbye: Enough Z'Nuff or the title song, by Donnie Vie, 2014
 Goodbye – The Greatest Hits, by JLS, 2013
 Goodbye, by Opiate for the Masses, 2003
 Goodbye, an EP by Seventh Avenue, 1999
 Goodbye, a re-release of I'm Good (Hahm Eun-jung EP), 2015

Songs
 "Good-Bye" (Sakanaction song), 2014
 "Good-Bye", by Jolin Tsai from 1019, 1999
 "Good-Bye", by So They Say from Antidote for Irony, 2006
 "Good-Bye!", written by Francesco Paolo Tosti, 1880
 "Good-Bye-Ee!", written by R. P. Weston and Bert Lee, 1917
 "Goodbye" (Air Supply song), 1993
 "Goodbye" (Alexia song), 1999
 "Goodbye" (Alma Čardžić song), 1997
 "Goodbye" (Army of Anyone song), 2006
 "Goodbye" (The Coral song), 2002
 "Goodbye" (The Corrs song), 2004
 "Goodbye" (Def Leppard song), 1999
 "Goodbye" (Feder song), featuring Lyse, 2015
 "Goodbye" (Gordon Jenkins song), first recorded by Benny Goodman, 1935; covered by many
 "Goodbye" (The Humans song), 2018
 "Goodbye" (Jason Derulo and David Guetta song), 2018
 "Goodbye" (Kate Ryan song), 2004
 "Goodbye" (Kristinia DeBarge song), 2009
 "Goodbye" (Mary Hopkin song), written by Paul McCartney, 1969
 "Goodbye" (Night Ranger song), 1985
 "Goodbye" (Shila Amzah song), 2015
 "Goodbye" (Slaughterhouse song), 2012
 "Goodbye" (Slipknot song), 2016
 "Goodbye" (Sneaky Sound System song), 2007
 "Goodbye" (Spice Girls song), 1998
 "Goodbye" (Tevin Campbell song), 1992
 "Goodbye (Astrid Goodbye)", by Cold Chisel, 1978
 "Goodbye (Shelter)", by Sanja Vučić, 2017
 "Goodbye", by 2NE1, 2017
 "Goodbye", by Alien Ant Farm from Truant, 2003
 "Goodbye", by Audio Adrenaline from Adios: The Greatest Hits, 2006
 "Goodbye", by Avril Lavigne from Goodbye Lullaby, 2011
 "Goodbye", by B.A.P from No Mercy, 2012
 "Goodbye", by Barry Ryan, 1968
 "Goodbye", by Best Coast from Crazy for You, 2010
 "Goodbye", by Billie Eilish from When We All Fall Asleep, Where Do We Go?, 2019
 "Goodbye", by Blacklite District
 "Goodbye", by Bleachers from Gone Now, 2017
 "Goodbye", by Bo Burnham from the special Bo Burnham: Inside, 2021
 "Goodbye", by Caliban from The Opposite from Within, 2004
 "Goodbye", by Claudia Emmanuela Santoso from the TV series The Voice of Germany, 2019
 "Goodbye", by Danger Danger from Dawn, 1995
 "Goodbye", by Dave Gahan from Paper Monsters, 2003
 "Goodbye", by Default from Comes and Goes, 2009
 "Goodbye", by Earshot from Two, 2004
 "Goodbye", by Echosmith from Inside a Dream, 2017
 "Goodbye", by Eddie Vedder from Ukulele Songs, 2011
 "Goodbye", by Elton John from Madman Across the Water, 1971
 "Goodbye", by Everlast from Forever Everlasting, 1990
 "Goodbye", by Everlife from Everlife, 2007
 "Goodbye", by G.E.M. from Heartbeat, 2015
 "Goodbye", by George Baker Selection from Little Green Bag, 1970
 "Goodbye", by Girls' Generation from Mr.Mr., 2014
 "Goodbye", by Glenn Morrison, 2013
 "Goodbye", by Gravity Kills from Gravity Kills, 1996
 "Goodbye", by Hootie & The Blowfish from Cracked Rear View, 1994
 "Goodbye", by Inna (recording as Alessandra), 2008
 "Goodbye", by Iyaz from Replay, 2010
 "Goodbye", by Jagged Edge from Jagged Little Thrill, 2001
 "Goodbye", by The Luchagors from The Luchagors, 2007
 "Goodbye", by Labi Siffre from The Singer and the Song, 1971
 "Goodbye", by Luna from Lunapark, 1992
 "Goodbye", by Miley Cyrus from Breakout, 2008
 "Goodbye", by Mudvayne from The End of All Things to Come, 2002
 "Goodbye", by Natalie Imbruglia from White Lilies Island, 2001
 "Goodbye", by Neil Cicierega from Mouth Silence, 2014
 "Goodbye", by Ozzy Osbourne from Ordinary Man, 2020
 "Goodbye", by Park Hyo-shin, 2019
 "Goodbye", by Porches from The House, 2018
 "Goodbye", by The Pretenders, 1997
 "Goodbye", by the Psychedelic Furs from Forever Now, 1982
 "Goodbye", by Red Flag from The Crypt, 2000
 "Goodbye", by Sascha Schmitz from Open Water, 2006
 "Goodbye", by Secondhand Serenade from A Twist in My Story, 2008
 "Goodbye", by Shed Seven from Let It Ride, 1998
 "Goodbye", by SR-71 from Tomorrow, 2002
 "Goodbye", by Stabbing Westward from Darkest Days, 1998
 "Goodbye", by Steve Earle from Train a Comin', 1995
 "Goodbye", by the Sundays from Blind, 1992
 "Goodbye", by Tracy Chapman from Let It Rain, 2002
 "Goodbye", by Vanessa Williams from The Comfort Zone, 1991
 "Goodbye", by Who Is Fancy, 2015
 "Goodbye", by Wiz Khalifa from Deal or No Deal, 2009
 "Goodbye?", by Grandaddy from Excerpts from the Diary of Todd Zilla, 2005
 "Goodbye (Kelly's Song)", by Alabama from Pass It On Down, 1990
 "Goodbye (Klayton's 2012 Mix)", by Celldweller from The Complete Cellout, 2011
 "Goodbye, Goodbye", by Oingo Boingo from the soundtrack to Fast Times at Ridgemont High, 1982
 "Goodbye Goodbye", by Brotherhood of Man from Higher Than High, 1979
 "Goodbye Goodbye", by Chips featuring Linda Martin, 1977
 "Goodbye Goodbye", by Tegan and Sara from Heartthrob, 2013
 "Goodbye Song", from Bear in the Big Blue House
 "Goodbye's (The Saddest Word)", by Celine Dion, 2002
 "Goodbyes" (James Cottriall song), 2010
 "Goodbyes" (Post Malone song), 2019
 "Goodbyes", by 3 Doors Down from The Greatest Hits, 2012
 "Goodbyes", by Jorja Smith from Lost & Found, 2018
 "Goodbyes", by Roam from Backbone, 2016
 "Hi-Ho"/"Good Bye", a single by hide, 1996

Television episodes
 "Good-Bye" (Rescue Me)
 "Good-bye" (The Wonder Years)
 "Goodbye" (8 Simple Rules)
 "Goodbye" (Blossom)
 "Goodbye" (Fullmetal Alchemist)
 "Goodbye" (Glee)
 "Goodbye" (Grey's Anatomy)
 "Goodbye" (The Practice)
 "Goodbyeee", an episode of Blackadder Goes Forth

Other uses
 Good-Bye (manga), a manga by Yoshihiro Tatsumi and published by Drawn and Quarterly
 The Goodbye Family, a Weird West series created by Lorin Morgan-Richards
 "Goodbye", a 2006 tour by Australian comedy team Lano and Woodley

See also
 Auf Wiedersehen (disambiguation), German for "Goodbye"
 Bye (disambiguation)
 Bye Bye (disambiguation)
 "Good Goodbye", a song by Linkin Park
 Goodby (disambiguation)
 Goodbye Again (disambiguation)
 Goodbye Cruel World (disambiguation)
 Goodbye Girl (disambiguation)
 Goodbye to You (disambiguation)
 Never Can Say Goodbye (disambiguation)
 Never Say Goodbye (disambiguation)